MTB may refer to:

Science and medicine
 Magnetotactic bacteria
 Mediterranean tamarisk beetle
 Multilobular tumour of bone, canine disease
 Mycobacterium tuberculosis

Transport and vehicles
 Matlock Bath railway station, England; National Rail station code MTB
 Mississauga Truck and Bus Collision, a Canadian bus manufacturer
 Motor torpedo boat
 Mountain bike

Other uses
Magandang Tanghali Bayan, a variety show in the Philippines
 M&T Bank of New York, NYSE symbol
 My Therapy Buddy, a talking plush doll for adults